Apple Valley is a census-designated place (CDP) in Knox County, in the U.S. state of Ohio. It consists of a planned community surrounding a  reservoir named Apple Valley Lake. As of the 2010 census the CDP had a population of 5,058.

Primarily a resort community, Apple Valley contains a golf course.

Demographics

References

External links
 Apple Valley Property Owner's Association
 Apple Valley Lake Ohio Real Estate
 Live Apple Valley Lake Cam

Unincorporated communities in Knox County, Ohio
Unincorporated communities in Ohio
Census-designated places in Knox County, Ohio
Census-designated places in Ohio